Tehachapi may refer to:
Tehachapi, California in the Tehachapi Mountains
California Correctional Institution, colloquially referred to as "Tehachapi"
Tehachapi High School in Tehachapi, California
Tehachapi Unified School District, based in Tehachapi, California 
Tehachapi Mountains surrounding Tehachapi, California, and often considered the southern boundary of Central California
Tehachapi Municipal Airport (KTSP) in Tehachapi, California
Tehachapi News, based in Tehachapi, California
Tehachapi Pass in the Tehachapi Mountains
Tehachapi Loop, the railroad engineering feat enabling trains to traverse the Tehachapi Pass
Tehachapi Pass Wind Farm, one of the largest wind farms in California
Tehachapi Energy Storage Project, At the time of commissioning in 2014, it was the largest lithium-ion battery system operating in North America and one of the largest in the world
Tehachapi Tribe, an Indian tribe best remembered for the 1863 Keyesville Massacre in which 53 men from the tribe were killed in Keyesville, California
The Tempest from Tehachapi, a massive 1977 duststorm bearing Coccidioidomycosis

In popular culture
Tehachapi, a 1995 Christina Applegate movie, later retitled Across the Moon
Endurance Tehachapi, the fourth season of the Survivor-like reality program featuring teenagers